Karl Giese (18 October 1898 – March 1938) was a German archivist, museum curator, and the life partner of Magnus Hirschfeld.

Biography

Early years 
Giese was the youngest of six children of a working-class family and had three brothers and two sisters. His family lived in Schulstraße 17, not far from today's subway station Leopoldplatz.

Institut für Sexualwissenschaft 
When Giese was a student he met Magnus Hirschfeld after a lecture in Munich around 1918.  Later he became an employee in the Institut für Sexualwissenschaft and finally Hirschfeld's life partner. He took over the management of the archive of the Institute. Hirschfeld described their relationship as a "physical-mental connection". Giese also gave lectures, curated exhibitions and wrote articles.

During this time, Giese met the British archaeologist Francis Turville-Petre and the French author and later Nobel Prize laureate André Gide. British-American writer Christopher Isherwood, who lived for some months in the neighboring building, wrote about himself and Karl Giese: 

Ellen Bækgaard, a dentist from Copenhagen and World League for Sexual Reform committee member, describes Giese in her memoirs as "woman of the house". According to Bækgaard, Giese enjoyed decorating the place and doing needlework, as well as looking after Hirschfeld's wardrobe.

Karl Giese was interested in theater and acting. He was part of a theater group Theater der Eigenen. Giese also had a role as the young violinist Paul Körner in Richard Oswald's film Different from the Others.

When Magnus Hirschfeld traveled on world tour in 1930-31, he entrusted Giese to run the affairs of the Institute.

Exile in Paris 
Hirschfeld did not return to Germany from his world journey in 1932, and Giese went to meet him in Paris. Hirschfeld was by then living with another partner, a 23-year-old Chinese medical student named Li Shiu Tong.

He also made contact with the magazine  (New Voice: Journal of Sexual Reform), arranging the publication of some articles by both Hirschfeld and himself.

Later years 
In 1934 Karl Giese traveled to Paris to join Hirschfeld but was soon apprehended in a public bathhouse, arrested on charges of "public indecency", and sentenced to three months in prison. Following his imprisonment, Giese's French visa was terminated, and he was expelled from France in October 1934. Returning to Nazi Germany was out of the question, so he relocated to Vienna and lived there for one year, preparing for university admission exams. Hirschfeld and other benefactors (Bækgaard and Norman Haire) covered his living expenses and expected him to take up the study of medicine in London after completing exams in Vienna.

After Hirschfeld's death in 1935, Giese was allowed to enter France to attend Hirschfeld's funeral in Nice. Two months before his death, Hirschfeld had designated Li Shiu Tong and Karl Giese as his principal heirs, stipulating in his will that both men should use their inheritances to advance sexual science, not for personal expenses. Karl Giese was heir of the library and the few objects that had been saved from the Institute. Ultimately he was not able to use his inheritance. Norman Haire privately provided Giese with financial help in the hope that he would relocate to Britain as per Hirschfeld's wishes. However, Giese moved to Brno in 1936 and lived with the Jewish lawyer Karl Fein for several months before moving into his own flat.

At the time of the Nazi annexation of Austria and shortly before the Nazi takeover of the Czech Sudetenland, Giese committed suicide in Brno in March 1938. His heir, Karl Fein, was deported to Theresienstadt by the Nazi regime in August 1942, and died in February 1943. Giese's possessions, including his inheritance from Hirschfeld, were lost in the Holocaust.

Other information 
A memorial plaque was placed in front of Giese's residence in Berlin-Tiergarten, at John-Foster-Dulles-Allee 10, on February 9, 2016.

See also

References 

1898 births
1938 deaths
1938 suicides
Magnus Hirschfeld
German emigrants to France
German LGBT rights activists
Sex educators
German curators
German LGBT people
Suicides in Czechoslovakia